Jelaiah is a district in Qatar, located in the municipality of Ad Dawhah. Together with Al Tarfa and Jeryan Nejaima, it makes up Zone 68 which has a total population of 5,521 as of 2015.

The district hosts the Canadian Veterinary Hospital Doha and has hosted the Embassy of the Philippines in Doha since January 2013.

Etymology
In local dialect, "jelaiah" is the pronunciation of the Arabic word "qelaia", which itself is derived from "qalaa", which translates to "fort". This name was bestowed on the district in honor of a small fort that is found in the area.

Gallery

References

Communities in Doha